Laotian passports are issued to citizens of Laos by Consular Department within the Ministry of Foreign Affairs to travel internationally. The biometric passport has been issued since 30 June 2016.

Physical appearance

Front Cover 

The Lao ordinary passport cover is dark blue in colour with the Emblem of Laos emblazoned in its centre. The word "ສາທາລະນະລັດ ປະຊາທິປະໄຕ ປະຊາຊົນລາວ" (English: Lao People's Democratic Republic and French: République Démocratique Populaire Lao) is inscribed on the top of the coat of arms while the word passport (in Lao, English and French) is inscribed below. The official and diplomatic passports are green and burgundy in colour respectively. The Lao ordinary passport has 32 pages excluding the cover and is valid to travel to all countries.

Passport note 

"ໃນນາມ ລັດຖະບານ ແຫ່ງ ສາທາລະນະລັດ ປະຊາທິປະໄຕ ປະຊາຊົນລາວ ກະຊວງການຕ່າງປະເທດ ຂໍໃຫ້ເຈົ້າໜ້າທີ່ ທີ່ກ່ຽວຂ້ອງຈົ່ງໃຫ້ອຳນວຍຄວາມສະດວກ ໃນການໄປມາ ແກ່ຜູ້ຖືໜັງສືຜ່ານແດນສະບັບນີ້ ແລະ ໃຫ້ຄວາມຊ່ວຍເຫຼືອຄຸ້ມຄອງໃນຄາວຈຳເປັນອີກດ້ວຍ."

"Au nom du Gouvernement de la République Démocratique Populaire Lao, le Ministère des Affaires étrangères prie les autorités compétentes de laisser passer librement le titulaire de ce passeport, et de lui donner aide et protection en cas de besoin."

"In the name of the Government of the Lao People's Democratic Republic, the Ministry of Foreign Affairs requests all relevant authorities to whom it may concern to allow the bearer to pass freely, and to afford the bearer any such assistance and protection as maybe necessary."

Information page 

 Photograph of the bearer 
 Type
 Code of Issuing State (LAO)
 Passport number
 Name and Surname 
 Nationality (Lao)
 Date of Birth 
 Sex
 Place of Birth
 Date of issue 
 Date of expiry 
 Name in Lao
 Emergency contact detail 
 Bearer signature 
 Issuing authority

See also
 List of passports
 Visa requirements for Laotian citizens

References
 http://www.mofa.gov.la/index.php/lo/passport_application

Passports by country
Foreign relations of Laos